Tymersol is a rural locality (a railway station) in Daktuyskoye Rural Settlement of Magdagachinsky District, Amur Oblast, Russia. The population was 5 as of 2018.

Geography 
The village is located 22 km from Magdagachi and 7 km from Daktuy.

Ethnicity 
The village is inhabited by Russians.

References 

Rural localities in Magdagachinsky District